Alangulam may refer to:

 Alangulam, Virudhunagar, a town in Virudhunagar district, Tamil Nadu in India
 Alangulam, Tirunelveli, a town in Tirunelveli district, Tamil Nadu in India